The Aguacapa River is a river in Guatemala.

The river was dammed in 1981 in order to power the turbines of the Aguacapa Hydroelectric Power Plant. In 2015 a second dam was built for the El Cóbano Hydroelectric Power Plant.

See also
List of rivers of Guatemala

References

Rand McNally, The New International Atlas, 1993.

Rivers of Guatemala